The Power World Tour (also known as the Power Galaxy Tour) is the second world tour by South Korean music label YG Entertainment in 2014, the last being the Past, Present & the Future world tour in 2006. The tour marks the entertainment agency's first family concert in two years. The tour kicked off at Kyocera Dome in Osaka, Japan for a two-day performance on April 12 and 13 before visiting other cities in Japan, China and Korea. The tour was officially sponsored by Samsung Galaxy in China, Taiwan and Singapore.

Artists
Big Bang
Psy
2NE1
Epik High
Lee Hi
Akdong Musician
Winner
iKON

Set list
This set list is representative of the show on April 12, 2014 in Osaka. It is not representative of all concerts for the duration of the tour.

 "Crush" 
 "Fire" 
 "Come Back Home" 
 "Gotta Be You" 
 "Go Up" 
 "Missing You (2NE1 cover)" 
 "Smile Again" 
 "Fly" 
 "Love Love Love (feat. Dara)" 
 "Don’t Hate Me" 
 "Haru Haru" 
 "Blue" 
 "Koe o Kikasete" 
 "Fantastic Baby" 
 "Just Another Boy" 
 "Climax" 
 "The Baddest Female" 
 "MTBD" 
 "Crayon" 
 "Doom Dada" 
 "Ugly (2NE1 cover)" 
 "Ringa Linga" 
 "Rose" 
 "1. 2. 3. 4." 
 "If I Were You" 
 "Tomorrow (feat. Taeyang)" 
 "Up (feat. Park Bom)" 
 "Phone Number (Jinusean cover)" 
 "High High (GD&TOP cover)" 
 "I Love You (2NE1 cover)" 
 "Scream" 
 "I Am the Best" 
 "Can't Nobody" 
 "My Heaven" 
 "Hands Up" 
 "Gara Gara Go!" 
 "Lies" 

Encore (by YG Family)
 "Go Away" 
 "Gangnam Style" 
 "Fantastic Baby"

Tour dates

References

External links
YG Entertainment
YGEX

2014 concert tours
YG Entertainment